The 1918–19 Army Cadets men's basketball team represented United States Military Academy during the 1918–19 college men's basketball season. The head coach was Ivens Jones, coaching his third season with the Cadets. The team captain was Joseph Cranston.

Schedule

|-

References

Army Black Knights men's basketball seasons
Army
Army Cadets Men's Basketball Team
Army Cadets Men's Basketball Team